Canal+ Sport may refer to:
Canal+ Sport (France), a French television channel owned by the French Canal+ Group
Canal+ Sport (Poland), a Polish television channel owned by Canal+ Cyfrowy
Canal+ Sport 1 (Scandinavia), a Scandinavian television channel owned by C More Entertainment
Canal+ Deportes, a Spanish television channel owned by Sogecable